The Assistant Secretary of Defense for Homeland Defense and Hemispheric Affairs, or ASD (HD-HA), is responsible for the supervision of DoD homeland defense activities, defense support of civil authorities, and cyber affairs for the Department of Defense. The position was established by the National Defense Authorization Act for Fiscal Year 2003 (P.L. 107-314, passed 2 December 2002). In particular, the ASD (HD&GS) is responsible for homeland preparedness, oversight of the two combatant commands that cover North and South America, and the transfer of technologies to homeland security use, pursuant to Section 1401 of the 2003 DOD Authorization Act. The ASD (HD&GS) reports to the Under Secretary of Defense for Policy.

Precedent 

At the end of the Eisenhower administration, a wide-ranging federal reorganization (Reorganization Plan No. 1 of 1958) transferred to the president the civil defense responsibilities and authorities formerly assigned to the Federal Civil Defense Administration. In Executive Order 10952 (signed 20 July 1961), the president delegated these functions to the Secretary of Defense. The SecDef then created the post of Assistant Secretary of Defense (Civil Defense) on August 31, 1961, to help manage these responsibilities. Only one man, Steuart L. Pittman, ever held this post. His term in office ran September 20, 1961 - April 1, 1964, at which time the post was abolished.

The Office of Civil Defense then transitioned to the Secretary of the Army, but responsibility for civil defense was quickly assigned to the new Defense Civil Preparedness Agency (DCPA). After a Carter administration reorganization (Reorganization Plan No. 3 of 19 June 1978) led to the dissolution of DCPA in July 1979, the director of the new Federal Emergency Management Agency assumed responsibility for civil defense. Nevertheless, DoD continued to maintain and develop resources for civil defense, but with dispersed, overlapping, and informal authorities for growing and coordinating them. The ASD (HD&GS) now provides a single point of contact at DoD for FEMA, state and local disaster management agencies, and executive policymakers in the event that these resources need to be enhanced or mobilized.

Office holders 
The table below includes both the various titles of this post over time, as well as all the holders of those offices.

References